This is a list of potential energy functions that are frequently used in quantum mechanics and have any meaning.

One-dimensional potentials 
 Rectangular potential barrier
 Delta potential (aka "contact potential")
 Double delta potential
 Step potential
 Periodic potential
 Barrier potential
 Gaussian potential
 Eckart potential

Wells 
 Quantum well
 Potential well
 Finite potential well
 Infinite potential well
 Double-well potential
 Semicircular potential well
 Circular potential well
 Spherical potential well
 Triangular potential well

Interatomic potentials
 Interatomic potential
 Bond order potential
 EAM potential
 Coulomb potential
 Buckingham potential
 Lennard-Jones potential
 Morse potential
 Morse/Long-range potential
 Rosen–Morse potential
 Trigonometric Rosen–Morse potential
 Stockmayer potential
 Pöschl–Teller potential
 Axilrod–Teller potential
 Mie potential

Oscillators 
 Harmonic potential (harmonic oscillator)
 Morse potential (morse oscillator)
 Morse/Long-range potential (Morse/Long-range oscillator)
 Kratzer potential (Kratzer oscillator)

Quantum Field theory 
 Yukawa potential
 Coleman–Weinberg potential
 Uehling potential
 Woods–Saxon potential

Miscellaneous 
 Quantum potential
 Pseudopotential
 Kolos–Wolniewicz potential

See also
 List of quantum-mechanical systems with analytical solutions
 List of integrable models

Science-related lists
Quantum mechanical potentials